The Oneida people (autonym: Onʌyoteˀa·ká·, Onyota'a:ka, the People of the Upright Stone, or standing stone, Thwahrù·nęʼ in Tuscarora) are a Native American tribe and First Nations band. They are one of the five founding nations of the Iroquois Confederacy in the area of upstate New York, particularly near the Great Lakes.

Originally the Oneida lived in what is now central New York, particularly around Oneida Lake and Oneida County. Today the Oneida have four federally recognized nations: the Oneida Indian Nation in New York, the Oneida Nation in and around Green Bay, Wisconsin, in the United States; and two in Ontario, Canada: Oneida at Six Nations of the Grand River and Oneida Nation of the Thames in Southwold.

People of the Standing Stone
The name Oneida is derived from the English pronunciation of Onyota'a:ka, the people's name for themselves. Onyota'a:ka means "People of the Standing Stone". This identity is based on an ancient legend. The Oneida people were being pursued on foot by an enemy tribe. As their enemies chased the Oneida into a clearing within the woodlands, they suddenly disappeared. The enemy could not find them, and so it was said that the Oneida had shapeshifted into the stones that stood in the clearing. As a result, they became known as the People of the Standing Stone.

Older legends have the Oneida people identifying as Latilutakówa, the "Big Tree People", "People of big trees". Not much is written about this. Iroquoian elders would have to be consulted on the oral history of this identification. The association may correspond to Iroquoian concepts of the Tree of Peace and the associated belief system of the people.

Individuals born into the Oneida Nation are identified according to their spirit name, or what may be called an Indian name, their clan, and their family unit within a clan. The people have a matrilineal kinship system, and children are considered to be born into the mother's clan, through which descent and inheritance passes. Each gender, clan, and family unit within a clan has particular duties and responsibilities in the tribe. Clan identities go back to the Creation Story of the Onyota'a:ka peoples. The people identify with three clans: the Wolf, Turtle or Bear clans. Children take their social status from their mother's clan. Because of this, her eldest brother is a significant figure for the children, especially boys. He supervises the boys' passage into adulthood as men.

History

Homeland boundaries
During the early 17th century, the Oneidas occupied and maintained roughly 6 million acres of land in what is modern day central New York State.  Formal boundaries were established in the 1768 Treaty of Fort Stanwix, and again, after September 4, 1784, when the governor of New York, George Clinton, requested from the Oneidas the borders of their land, borders were established in the Treaty of Fort Stanwix (1784).

American Revolution
The Oneida, along with the five other tribes of the Iroquois Confederacy, initially maintained a policy of neutrality in the American Revolution. This policy allowed the Confederacy increased leverage against both sides in the war, because they could threaten to join one side or the other in the event of any provocation. Neutrality quickly crumbled, however. The preponderance of the Mohawks, Senecas, Cayugas, and Onondagas sided with the Loyalists and British. For some time, the Oneidas continued advocating neutrality and attempted to restore consensus among the six tribes of the Confederacy.

But ultimately the Oneida, as well, had to choose a side. Because of their proximity and relations with the rebel communities, most Oneida favored the revolutionaries. In contrast, some of the pro-British tribes were closer to the British stronghold at Fort Niagara. In addition, the Oneida were influenced by the Presbyterian missionary Samuel Kirkland, who had worked among them since 1764. A number of Oneida were baptized as Christians in the decade before the Revolution. Kirkland worked to help them with education and their struggles with alcohol. Through relations with him, many began to form stronger cultural links to the colonists.

The Oneida officially joined the rebel side and contributed in many ways to the war effort. Their warriors were often used to scout on offensive campaigns and to assess enemy operations around Fort Stanwix (also known as Fort Schuyler). The Oneida also provided an open line of communication between the rebels and their Iroquois foes. In 1777 at the Battle of Oriskany, about fifty Oneida fought alongside the colonial militia, this included Tyonajanegen and her husband Han Yerry. Many Oneida formed friendships with Philip Schuyler, George Washington, the Marquis de Lafayette, and other prominent rebel leaders. Polly Cooper was an Oneida woman who traveled to Valley Forge in 1777 during the American Revolution. Under Chief Skenandon's leadership, the Oneidas brought bushels of maize to General George Washington's starving Patriot army.  Cooper showed Washington's people how to properly cook and eat the corn.  Washington's intentions were to pay cash to Cooper for her generosity, but she refused to accept compensation because she said it was her duty to serve her country. As a token of appreciation, Martha Washington, wife of George Washington, brought Cooper to Philadelphia and bought her a shawl, hat, and bonnet.  These men recognized the Oneida contributions during and after the war.

Although leaders of the tribe had taken the colonists' side, individuals within the decentralized nation could make their own decisions about alliances. A minority, who were already a faction supporting the sachems, supported the British. As the war progressed and the Oneida position became more dire, this minority grew more numerous. When rebel colonists destroyed the important Oneida settlement at Kanonwalohale, numerous Oneida defected from the rebellion and relocated to Fort Niagara to live under British protection.

1794 Treaty of Canandaigua
After the war, the Oneida were displaced by retaliatory and other raids by American settlers, who did not always distinguish between Iroquois who had been allies or foes. In 1794 they, along with other Haudenosaunee nations, signed the Treaty of Canandaigua with the United States. They were granted  of lands, primarily in New York; this was effectively the first Indian reservation in the United States.

1838 Treaty in Wisconsin
Essentially the Oneida had to share land at the Onondaga Reservation and did not have land to call their own. In the 1820s and 1830s many of the Oneida remaining in New York relocated to Wisconsin, where they were allowed to buy land, and to Canada, because the United States was pressing for Indian removals from eastern states. Settlers kept encroaching on them.

In 1838 Daniel Bread (1800-1873) helped negotiate a treaty for the Oneida in Wisconsin by which they asserted their intention to hold their piece of land communally. The amount of land had been reduced by the U.S., as had happened to the Menominee-Stockbridge Indians.

Oneida land claims
Cornelius Hill succeeded Daniel Bread as Chief after his death in 1873, and for decades fought further relocation of the Oneida, as well as privatization of common lands pursuant to the Dawes Act of 1887, which allowed such after a 25-year trust period. Hill, however, was based in Wisconsin and died in 1907, ostensibly during the trust period which would expire around 1920. After Hill's death, William Rockwell, a conservative, led the Oneida in New York essentially from 1910 to 1960.

Women Oneida activists pushed tribal land claims in the early 20th century. Laura "Minnie" Cornelius Kellogg and her attorney husband (from the Oneida Nation of Wisconsin), and Mary Cornelius Winder and her sister Delia Cornelius Waterman (from the Oneida Indian Nation of New York) were particularly influential from 1920 on in pressing land claims. The women worked from their homes in Prattsburg, New York and Oneida, Wisconsin. Particularly after the Indian Reorganization Act of 1934, Winder and her sister reached out to the Oneida of Wisconsin, and both American branches of the nation pushed jointly for their land claim. At that point, the remaining Oneida in New York had no land, and were subject to the Onondaga sharing their reservation.

They were encouraged by passage of the Indian Claims Commission Act of 1946, as before that they were unable to bring claims against the US government.
 
In 1970 and 1974 the Oneida Indian Nation of New York, Oneida Nation of Wisconsin, and the Oneida Nation of the Thames (made up of descendants of people who did not move to Canada until the 1840s) filed suit in the United States District Court for the Northern District of New York to reclaim land taken from them by New York without approval of the United States Congress.  In 1998, the United States intervened in the lawsuits on behalf of the plaintiffs in the claim so the claim could proceed against New York State.  The state had asserted immunity from suit under the Eleventh Amendment to the United States Constitution. The Defendants moved for summary judgment based on the U. S. Supreme Court's decision in City of Sherrill v. Oneida Indian Nation and the 2nd Circuit U.S. Court of Appeals' decision in Cayuga Indian Nation v. New York

On May 21, 2007, Judge Kahn dismissed the Oneida's possessory land claims and allowed the non-possessory claims to proceed. More recent litigation has formalized the split. It defines the separate interests of the Oneida tribe who stayed in New York and those who relocated to Wisconsin. The Oneida of Wisconsin have brought suit to reacquire lands in their ancestral homelands as part of the settlement of the aforementioned litigation.

Diet
The people made use of the land by "eating the seasons."  With a lack of fresh foods in the winter, during the autumn months, the Oneidas dried fruits and vegetables which they had harvested.  They also preserved meats in a brine or salt solution, and then hung them to dry.  During the fall they would eat deer, geese, duck and raccoon.  Feasting on those meats would store fat which would help them survive during the winter.  The Oneidas' diet also consisted of nuts such as hickory nuts, black walnuts, butternuts, and chestnuts.  The nuts added protein and fat that were needed to make it through the winter.  They also dried wild rice, which grew in swamp lands.  The wild rice was a source of complex carbohydrates.  When spring rolled around, the snow began to melt and the region became warm, the Oneidas' diet would change.  They would boil down and eat wild onions, leeks, milkweeds, and dandelions.  Spring was also when their fishing season began.  The fish in their diet consisted of trout, bullhead, walleye, pike, bass, and salmon.  Also during the spring months, maple trees provided sap that would be collected, then boiled down to make syrup and hard candy.  The maple candy would be used for consumption in this form or saved for later to flavor foods.  During the summer months the Oneidas would consume various fruits such as strawberries, blackberries, raspberries, blueberries, pears, plums, peaches, apples, and grapes.  The Oneidas also used sassafras for tea.

Dancing
There are two types of Oneida dancing: social and ceremonial.  Social dancing is for the enjoyment of all people.  The round dance, rabbit dance, old moccasin dance and canoe or fishing dance are different types of social dances.  Ceremonial dancing is sacred and is not to be performed in public.  Sacred dances are meant to be performed privately in the longhouses.  The Maple Syrup, Strawberry, Bean, Sun and Moon dances are different types of ceremonial dances.  Singing is a part of ceremonial dancing; however, they only chant during social dances.  There is an introduction for every song.  When the beat changes, the dancing begins.  Cues are given from the drums, which indicate to the dancers when to switch partners.  If a dancer was invited to dance, but refused, etiquette required them to offer tobacco as a settlement.

Traditional Clothing 
Clothing carries great meaning in the Oneida culture, as it is a physical representation of who they are. Before coming into contact with the Europeans, the Oneida tribe would use only natural materials to make their clothing. This would include using deer and other animal hides to stitch together clothing. However, when the Europeans arrived trading began and their clothing that was once made from animal hides began to be made from calico cotton and broadcloth and has stuck to be made from cotton ever since. The Oneidas would typically only be seen wearing moccasins on their feet. Even though there was a change in material used, the basic design of the outfits remained the same and still remains the same hundreds of years later.

Headwear: Oneida men and women wore different headwear. For the men, they would wear traditional Iroquois headdresses called kastoweh which would consist of feathers and insignia representing their tribe. The insignia for the Oneida Nation consists of three eagle feathers; two standing straight up and one falling downwards. Oneida women on the other hand would wear beaded tiaras. The beadwork on the tiaras would most commonly be sewn in woodland designs as it is a representation of their nation.

Recognized Oneida nations 
 Oneida Indian Nation in New York
 Oneida Nation of Wisconsin, in and around Green Bay, Wisconsin
 Oneida Nation of the Thames in Southwold, Ontario
 Oneida at Six Nations of the Grand River, Ontario

Education
Oneida Nation School System in Wisconsin is a K-12 tribal school.

Notable Oneida

Aaliyah, American recording artist, of Oneida and African-American descent.
Carl J. Artman, Assistant Secretary of the Bureau of Indian Affairs.
Daniel Bread (1800-1873), principal chief of the Oneida.
Polly Cooper, leader, took white corn to General Washington and troops in 1777-1778 during the Revolution in winter quarters at Valley Forge and taught them how to cook it. 
Cora Elm (1891-1949), American nurse in France during World War I 
Graham Greene, actor.
Charlie Hill, comedian, entertainer.
Laura "Minnie" Cornelius Kellogg, early 20th-century activist in Oneida land claims.
Lillie Rosa Minoka Hill, 20th-century Mohawk physician; officially adopted by Oneida for her work with them for decades.
Cody McCormick, Canadian professional ice hockey player for Colorado Avalanche.
Skenandoa (aka Skenando, Shenandoah), pine tree chief and leader during the American Revolution; ally of the Americans
Joanne Shenandoah, award-winning singer and performer.
Dennison Wheelock, composer, conductor and cornet soloist of the late 19th and early 20th centuries.
James Riley Wheelock, musician, conductor and clarinet soloist.
Tyonajanegen, leader, fought in Battle of Oriskany alongside husband Han Yerry.
Ray Halbritter, leader, Oneida Indian Nation, 1975-present.
Nyla Rose, professional wrestler.
Neilson Powless, professional cyclist (2020 Tour de France).

References

References
Glatthaar, Joseph T.  and James Kirby Martin.  Forgotten Allies: The Oneida Indians and the American Revolution.  London:  Macmillan, 2007.
Levinson, David. "An Explanation for the Oneida-Colonist Alliance in the American Revolution," Ethnohistory 23, no. 3. (Summer, 1976), pp. 265–289. Online via JSTOR (account required)

External links
Official website of the Oneida Indian Nation of New York
Official website of the Sovereign Oneida Nation of Wisconsin
Cofrin Library: Oneida Bibliography
Oneida Indian Tribe of Wisconsin
Official Website of the Oneida Nation of the Thames
Oneida Nation of the Thames Radio Station Website
Traditional Oneidas of New York

 
 
Iroquois
Indigenous peoples of the Northeastern Woodlands
Native American history of New York (state)
First Nations in Ontario
Native American tribes in New York (state)
Native American tribes in Wisconsin
Native Americans in the American Revolution